Qareh Jelu or Qarah Jelu or Qarah Jelow may refer to:
 Qarah Jelu, East Azerbaijan Province
 Qarah Jelow, Golestan
 Qareh Jelu, Kurdistan